Dane Murray (born 26 June 2003) is a Scottish professional footballer who plays as a defender for Celtic. On 20 July 2021, he made his professional senior debut against FC Midtjylland in the 2021–22 UEFA Champions League.

Career statistics

Club

References

2003 births
Living people
Scottish footballers
Association football defenders
Scotland youth international footballers
Celtic F.C. players
Lowland Football League players